George Logan Talbot (2 April 1907 – 15 December 1943) was a New Zealand first-class cricketer and soldier. He appeared in one Plunket Shield match for Canterbury in 1930 and was killed during the Second World War in 1943.

Life and military career
Talbot was born on 2 April 1907 in Christchurch. He appeared in one first-class Plunket Shield match for Canterbury against Otago between 28 February and 1 March 1930. During the match, which took place at Lancaster Park, Talbot used his right-arm medium bowling to score 3 wickets.

Talbot worked as a storeman before enlisting in the New Zealand Expeditionary Force during the Second World War. Rising to the rank of corporal in the New Zealand Armoured Corps, he was killed in action on 15 December 1943 when his tank was knocked out by a German 8.8 cm anti-tank gun. Talbot is buried at the Sangro River War Cemetery.

References

1907 births
1943 deaths
Cricketers from Christchurch
New Zealand cricketers
Canterbury cricketers
New Zealand military personnel of World War II
New Zealand military personnel killed in World War II
Tank personnel
Deaths by firearm in Italy
Deaths by explosive device